Varchand (also Romanized as Warchānd; also known as Darjand and Varjand) is a village in Alishar Rural District, Kharqan District, Zarandieh County, Markazi Province, Iran. At the 2006 census, its population was 117, in 32 families.

References 

Populated places in Zarandieh County